is a 170-metre (558 ft), 36-story educational facility located in Nakamura-ku, Nagoya, Aichi, Japan. The building is home to three vocational schools: Nagoya Mode Gakuen, HAL Nagoya and Nagoya Isen.

It is one of the tallest buildings in Nagoya.

See also 
 List of twisted buildings
 Mode Gakuen Cocoon Tower

External links 

Commercial buildings completed in 2008
Skyscrapers in Nagoya
Twisted buildings and structures
Skyscrapers in Japan
2008 establishments in Japan